The south-west corner drainage region of Western Australia is one of only two temperate and relatively fertile parts of mainland Australia. For comparison, this is about the same size as North Carolina or a little larger than England. 

The landscape is generally flat and sandy but there are several major features, in particular the Stirling Range near Albany, which reaches  at its highest point, and the Darling Scarp. 

The climate is temperate Mediterranean. Summers are warm to hot and dry, winters are cool and wet.

Other Western Australian drainage divisions include:
 Pilbara freshwater ecoregion
 Timor Sea drainage division in the Kimberley and the Northern Territory Top End.

Other Australian drainage divisions include:
 Gulf of Carpentaria
 Australian north-east coast drainage division
 Australian south-east coast drainage division
 Murray-Darling Basin
 South Australian gulf drainage division
 Lake Eyre Basin
 Western Plateau

See also
 List of watercourses in Western Australia
 List of rivers of Australia

References
 Beard, J. S. (1999) Evolution of the river systems of the south-west drainage division, Western Australia.  Journal of the Royal Society of Western Australia, Dec. 1999, p. 147-164'
 Olsen, Graeme. and Skitmore, E.  The state of the rivers of the South West Drainage Division Leederville, W.A : Western Australian Water Resources Council, 1991. Water resource perspectives Publication ; no. 2/91  
 Schofiled, N.J. et al. ( 1989) Vegetation strategies to reduce stream salinities of water resource catchments in southwest Western Australia : prepared for the Steering Committee for Research on Land Use and Water Supply  Leederville, W.A : Water Authority of Western Australia . Report (Water Authority of Western Australia) ; no. WS 33. 
 South West Catchments Council South West regional strategy for natural resource management Bunbury, W.A.: South West Catchments Council  

Drainage basins of Australia
Regions of Western Australia
Southwest Australia